Idalus tybris is a moth of the family Erebidae. It was described by Pieter Cramer in 1776. It is found in Brazil.

References

External links
 

tybris
Moths described in 1776
Taxa named by Pieter Cramer